Hiland Lockwood Fairbanks (September 21, 1871 – February 15, 1909) was an American minor league baseball player, lawyer and college football player and coach. He was a two-sport athlete at Bowdoin College in Brunswick, Maine, playing quarterback on the school's football team and serving as a team captain in 1893. During his collegiate days, he also played baseball for the Bangor Millionaires. After graduating, he served as the head football coach at the University of Mississippi in Oxford, Mississippi for one season, in 1895,, compiling a record of 2–1.

Fairbanks died after suffering from tuberculosis in 1909. The Hiland Lockwood Fairbanks award at Bowdoin is named in his honor.

Head coaching record

References

External links
 
 

1871 births
1909 deaths
19th-century players of American football
American football quarterbacks
Baseball third basemen
Bowdoin Polar Bears baseball players
Bowdoin Polar Bears football players
Bangor Millionaires players
Ole Miss Rebels football coaches
Harvard Law School alumni
People from Farmington, Maine
Players of American football from Maine
Baseball players from Maine
20th-century deaths from tuberculosis
Tuberculosis deaths in Maine